The Open Costa Adeje – Isla de Tenerife was a professional tennis tournament played on outdoor hard courts. It was part of the ATP Challenger Tour. It was held in Adeje, Tenerife, Spain, only in 2009.

Past finals

Singles

Doubles

External links
Official website
ITF search

 
Hard court tennis tournaments
Defunct tennis tournaments in Spain
Sport in Tenerife